The liga okręgowa (in some voivodeship named klasa okręgowa, English: regional league) is the 6th tier of the Polish football league system. The league is split into 58  groups, and there are present in every voivodeship. Teams promoted from liga okręgowa move up to the IV liga, whilst relegated teams descend to the Klasa A leagues.

The exception is the Greater Poland Voivodeship, where the V liga exists as the sixth level; the liga okręgowa represents the seventh level there. Teams promoted from liga okręgowa move up to the V liga, whilst relegated teams descend to the Klasa A leagues.

Groups

Current groups

References

External links
 Ligi regionalne 2019/20 

6
Poland